The Miss Texas USA competition is the pageant that selects the representative for the state Texas in the Miss USA pageant, and the name of the title held by that winner. This pageant is part of the Miss USA Organization, owned by Texas native Crystle Stewart, herself a Miss USA for 2008.

The pageant is currently held in Houston. It has previously been hosted by El Paso, San Antonio, South Padre Island, Lubbock and Laredo.  It was televised from 1971 to 2009.

The current titleholder is Allison Drake of Dallas, Texas, who assumed the position after Gabriel's win at Miss USA 2022 and eventually Miss Universe 2022. She was originally the second runner-up and only assumed the title when Sydni Leonard, the first runner-up to Gabriel at the state pageant, declined the offer.

Background
Unlike the rest of Miss and Teen state pageants in the Miss USA system have annually scheduled at the same time, this Miss and Teen pageants in Texas are held separately in different months, the Miss pageant goes first and is held on first Sunday of September every year. Those events have affected from the regular September schedule such as the 2018 pageant was held in January 2018 due to Hurricane Harvey devastated the pageant's host city, Houston; and the 2021 pageant was held in September 2021 due to the COVID-19 pandemic, exactly a year originally planned for September 2020.

Ten Miss Texas USA titleholders have won the Miss USA title, including Chelsi Smith, has been crowned Miss Universe. In the 1980s Texas won the Miss USA title five consecutive years from 1985 to 1989, a streak known as the "Texas Aces".  Prior to this no state had ever won the Miss USA pageant more than two times in succession.  Past state directors have included Richard Guy and Rex Holt, "GuyRex" and Al and Gail Clark of "The Crystal Group".

Contestants enter by winning local pageants or may choose to compete "at large" with an assigned title.  In 2001 a record number of former Miss Texas Teen USA winners, six, competed for the Miss Texas USA 2002 title.

Texas Aces
Prior to the 1980s, no other state had won more than two Miss USA pageants in succession (the only two states to win twice in succession were Virginia in 1969-1970 and Illinois in 1973–1974).  The five Texan Miss USA winners were all coached by "GuyRex", Richard Guy and Rex Holt, who held the Texas franchise from 1975.  The term was first used in 1988 after Gibbs became their fourth consecutive titleholder, with Guy referring to the four queens as "four aces in a deck of cards", with their fifth titleholder, Kim Tomes (1977) as the "wildcard".  The following year Gretchen Polhemus became the fifth and final "ace".  The term is still in use.

As well as directing the Texas pageant, GuyRex also acquired the Miss California USA franchise in 1986.  In 1988, Diana Magaña of California placed first runner-up to Gibbs, the fourth ace.  The two had both undergone extensive preparation by GuyRex, and even lived together prior to the pageant.

The five Aces were:
1985 - Laura Martinez-Herring (Miss USA, Top 10 at Miss Universe 1985)
1986 - Christy Fichtner (Miss USA, 1st runner-up at Miss Universe 1986)
1987 - Michelle Royer (Miss USA, 2nd runner-up at Miss Universe 1987)
1988 - Courtney Gibbs (Miss USA, Top 10 at Miss Universe 1988)
1989 - Gretchen Polhemus (Miss USA, 2nd runner-up at Miss Universe 1989)

Gallery

Results summary

Placements
Miss USAs: Kimberly Tomes (1977), Laura Martinez Herring (1985), Christy Fichtner (1986), Michelle Royer (1987), Courtney Gibbs (1988), Gretchen Polhemus (1989), Chelsi Smith (1995), Kandace Krueger (2001), Crystle Stewart (2008), R'Bonney Gabriel (2022)
1st runners-up: Carelgean Douglas (1959), Diane Balloun (1964), Brenda Box (1971), Luann Caughey (1982), Lisa Allred (1983), Ylianna Guerra (2015)
2nd runners-up: Barbara Horan (1978), Nicole O'Brian (2003)
3rd runners-up: Betty Lee (1954), Ana Rodriguez (2011)
4th runners-up: Jo Dodson (1956), Aundie Evers (1975), Alexandria Nugent (2013)
Top 5/6/8: Christine Friedel (1994), Amanda Little (1997), Holly Mills (1998), Victoria Hinojosa (2021)
Top 10/11/12: Lavonne McConnell (1973), Candace Gray (1976), Anne Hinnant (1979), Barbara Buckley (1980), Diana Durnford (1981), Laura Shaw (1984), Stephanie Kuehne (1990), Katie Young (1992), Angie Sisk (1993), Kara Williams (1996), Kasi Kelly (2002), Lauren Lanning (2006), Magen Ellis (2007), Brooke Daniels (2009), Brittany Booker (2012)
Top 15: Joan Bradshaw (1953), Mary Daughters (1955), Gloria Hunt (1957), Linda Daugherty (1958), Jackie Williams (1962), Phillis Johnson (1965), Dorothy Pickens (1966), Bonnie Robinson (1967), Sandy Drewes (1969), Diane Swendeman (1970), Stephanie Guerrero (2004), Tyler Willis (2005), Logan Lester (2018)

Texas holds a record of 55 placements at Miss USA, being placed first overall.

Awards
 Miss Congeniality: Diane Swendeman (1970), Chelsi Smith (1995)
 Miss Photogenic: Susan Peters (1972), Lisa Allred (1983), Laura Shaw (1984), Tyler Willis (2005)
 Best State Costume: Lavonne McConnell (1973), Kimberly Tomes (1977), Barbara Horan (1978), R'Bonney Gabriel (2022)
 Best in Swimsuit: Chelsi Smith (1995)

Winners
Color key

References

External links

Official website

 
Texas
Texas culture
Women in Texas
Recurring events established in 1952
1952 establishments in Texas
Annual events in Texas